May refer to:

 Aphex Twin (born Richard D. James, 1971), British musician and composer, known for his solo materials as well as projects The Tuss and Aphex Twin  
 Richard D. James Album, fourth studio album by electronic musician Richard D. James under the alias Aphex Twin, released in 1996
 Richard D. James (scientist) (born 1952), American mechanician and materials scientist

See also
 Richard James (disambiguation)